Sven Johansson (25 December 1928 – 15 January 2023) was a Swedish politician. A member of the Moderate Party, he served as Governor of Västerbotten County from 1978 to 1991.

Johansson died in Stockholm on 15 January 2023, at the age of 94.

References

1928 births
2023 deaths
Moderate Party politicians
Governors of Västerbotten County
Politicians from Malmö